Alvars (also known as Ālvārsī, Alvāres, Alvārī, and Alvārsī) is a village in Alvars Rural District of the Central District of Sareyn County, Ardabil province, Iran. At the 2006 census, its population was 1,007 in 199 households. The following census in 2011 counted 927 people in 258 households. The latest census in 2016 showed a population of 808 people in 241 households; it was the largest village in its rural district.

References

External links 
Tageo

Sareyn County

Towns and villages in Sareyn County

Populated places in Ardabil Province

Populated places in Sareyn County